Habay is an unincorporated community in northern Alberta within the Hay Lake Reserve of the Dene Tha' First Nation.

References 

Localities on Indian reserves in Alberta
Localities in Mackenzie County